Claddagh is an area close to the centre of Galway city, where the River Corrib meets Galway Bay. It was formerly a fishing village, just outside the old city walls. It is just across the river from the Spanish Arch, which was the location of regular fish markets where the locals supplied the city with seafood as recently as the end of the 19th century. People have been gathering seafood and fishing from the area for millennia. It is one of the oldest former fishing villages in Ireland - its existence having been recorded since the arrival of Christianity in the 5th century.

During the 19th century the Claddagh attracted many visitors, including writers who spread its fame. The original village of thatched cottages was razed in the 1930s and replaced by a council-housing scheme.

The Claddagh is most famous internationally for the Claddagh ring, which is popular among those of Irish heritage as both a friendship and wedding ring. This traditional design consists of two clasped hands holding a crowned heart, and symbolises love, friendship and loyalty.

The Claddagh area contains a national school, Community Centre and a Catholic Church as well as the new Claddagh Arts Centre.

Notable people 
 Thomas Grady, recipient of the Victoria Cross.
 Bobby Beggs, Dublin-born Gaelic footballer who later played for Galway.

See also
 King of the Claddagh
 Claddagh Palace
List of public art in Galway city
Nicholas Blake (Dominican)

References

External links
  Photos of Claddagh Galway
 Albertkahn.co.uk
 http://homepage.eircom.net/~claddaghns/oldcladdagh.htm
 https://web.archive.org/web/20130729201342/http://www.kennys.ie/News/OldGalway/05062008-TheGreenGrassintheCladdagh/
 http://www.libraryireland.com/IrishPictures/VII-Claddagh.php
 https://archive.today/20130218003431/http://www.kennys.ie/booktalk/old-galway/the-garra-glas-in-the-claddagh.html
 http://www.irishhistorylinks.net/pages/Old_Photos.html#Claddagh

Geography of Galway (city)